Guallatiri is a volcano in northern Chile.

Wallatiri  (hispanicized spellings Guallatire, Guallatiri, Huallatire, Huallatiri) may also refer to:

 Wallatiri (Challapata), a mountain in the Challapata Province, Oruro Department, Bolivia
 Wallatiri (La Paz), a mountain in the La Paz Department, Bolivia
 Wallatiri (Peru), a mountain in the Tacna Region, Peru
 Wallatiri (Poopó), a mountain in the Poopó Province, Oruro Department, Bolivia